Actually (stylised as Pet Shop Boys, actually.) is the second studio album by English synth-pop duo Pet Shop Boys, released on 7 September 1987 by Parlophone in the United Kingdom and by EMI Manhattan in North America. According to Neil Tennant and music historian Wayne Studer, Actually loosely critiques Thatcherism, the political zeitgeist of the 1980s, and was recorded in anticipation of Margaret Thatcher's re-election.

Release and promotion

Actually was released on 7 September 1987 by Parlophone in the United Kingdom and by EMI Manhattan in the United States and Canada. In television commercials for the release, Lowe and Tennant were shown in black tie, blank-faced against a white background. The former seems unimpressed by a radio DJ-style Alan 'Fluff' Freeman voiceover listing their previous hits and new singles from Actually, while the latter eventually "gets bored" and yawns, with the image then freezing to create, roughly, the album's cover shot.

Actually spawned four UK top 10 singles: the number-one single "It's a Sin", "Rent", "What Have I Done to Deserve This?"—a duet with fellow Parlophone artist Dusty Springfield, which peaked at number two in both the UK and US and led to a resurgence of interest in Springfield's earlier work—and another UK number one in April 1988 with a remixed version of the song "Heart".

During this period Pet Shop Boys also completed a full-length motion picture called It Couldn't Happen Here. Featuring songs by the duo, it was most famous for containing the video for "Always on My Mind" (starring Joss Ackland as a blind priest), which—while not on Actually—was released as a single during this period.

Actually was re-released in 2001 (as were most of the duo's albums up to that point) as Actually/Further Listening 1987–1988. The reissue was digitally remastered and included a second disc of B-sides, remixes done by Pet Shop Boys and previously unreleased material from around the time of the album's original release. Another re-release followed on 9 February 2009 under the title of Actually: Remastered, containing only the 10 tracks of the original release. With the 2009 re-release, the 2001 two-disc reissue was discontinued. On 2 March 2018, a new remastered two-disc Actually/Further Listening edition was released; the content remains the same as the 2001 edition.

Critical reception

Actually was well received by critics. In December 1987, Robert Christgau of The Village Voice praised it as "actual pop music with something actual to say—pure commodity, and proud of it." In his retrospective review, Stephen Thomas Erlewine of AllMusic said that Actually is the album where "the Pet Shop Boys perfected their melodic, detached dance-pop."

Actually is featured in the 2005 musical reference book 1001 Albums You Must Hear Before You Die, and has been recognised in various other "must-listen" lists. In 2006, Q magazine included Actually in its list of the "40 Best Albums of the '80s" at number 22. In 2012, Slant Magazine ranked the record at number 88 on its list of the "100 Best Albums of the 1980s". In 2020, Rolling Stone placed Actually at number 435 on its list of the "500 Greatest Albums of All Time".

In popular culture
Although not released as a single, the track "Shopping" is frequently featured as background music in British television news and current affairs programmes dealing with retail business issues and as bumper music on home shopping shows. This is despite the fact that the song is actually a critique of privatisation in 1980s Britain, and has little to do with actual shopping. "Shopping" was also used in a season 1 episode of the Disney Channel television series Lizzie McGuire. "King's Cross" served in the Japanese media as a commercial song to the Aurex's (owned by Toshiba) cassette tape recorder model XDR.

Track listing

Personnel
Credits adapted from the liner notes of Actually.

Pet Shop Boys
 Neil Tennant
 Chris Lowe

Additional musicians
 Andy Richards – Fairlight and keyboard programming
 Blue Weaver – Fairlight and keyboard programming
 Gary Maughan – Fairlight and keyboard programming
 Adrian Cook – Fairlight and keyboard programming
 J. J. Jeczalik – Fairlight and keyboard programming
 Dusty Springfield – guest vocals 
 Angelo Badalamenti – orchestra arrangement

Technical
 Julian Mendelsohn – production, engineering ; mixing 
 Stephen Hague – production ; mixing 
 David Jacob – engineering ; production ; mix engineering 
 Pet Shop Boys – production 
 Shep Pettibone – production 
 Dave Meegan – engineering 
 Andy Richards – production 
 Tony Phillips – engineering

Artwork
 Mark Farrow – design
 Pet Shop Boys – design
 Cindy Palmano – cover photograph
 Eric Watson – inner sleeve photograph

Charts

Weekly charts

Year-end charts

Certifications and sales

References

Bibliography

External links
 

1987 albums
Albums produced by Julian Mendelsohn
Albums produced by Shep Pettibone
Albums produced by Stephen Hague
Parlophone albums
Pet Shop Boys albums